7816 Hanoi, provisional designation , is an eccentric stony asteroid and Mars-crosser from the inner regions of the asteroid belt, approximately 3 kilometers in diameter. It was discovered on 18 December 1987, by Japanese astronomer Masahiro Koishikawa at the Ayashi Station of the Sendai Astronomical Observatory, Japan, and later named after the Vietnamese capital of Hanoi.

Orbit and classification 

Hanoi orbits the Sun in the inner main-belt at a distance of 1.6–3.0 AU once every 3 years and 6 months (1,287 days). Its orbit has an eccentricity of 0.29 and an inclination of 2° with respect to the ecliptic. No precoveries were taken. The asteroid's observation arc begins with its official discovery observation.

Physical characteristics

Lightcurves 

In November 2011, a rotational lightcurve of Hanoi was obtained from photometric observations made American astronomer by Brian Warner at his Palmer Divide Observatory in Colorado. The lightcurve gave a rotation period of  hours with a brightness variation of 0.72 magnitude.

Diameter and albedo 

The Collaborative Asteroid Lightcurve Link assumes a standard albedo for stony asteroids of 0.20, and calculates a diameter of 3.0 kilometers with an absolute magnitude of 15.0.

Naming 

This minor planet was named after the city of Hanoi, capital of Vietnam, which the discoverer visited in 1997. Together with astronomer Yoshihide Kozai, after whom the minor planet 3040 Kozai is named, he assisted local astronomers install a Schmidt-Cassegrain and a refracting telescope at HNUE. The installed instrumentation was funded by the Japanese Sumitomo Foundation, with the intention to foster Vietnamese astronomical research. The official naming citation was published by the Minor Planet Center on 2 February 1999.

See also 
 List of astronomical objects discovered by Masahiro Koishikawa

References

External links 
  
 Lightcurve plot of 7816 Hanoi, Palmer Divide Observatory, B. D. Warner (2001)
 Asteroid Lightcurve Database (LCDB), query form (info )
 Dictionary of Minor Planet Names, Google books
 Asteroids and comets rotation curves, CdR – Observatoire de Genève, Raoul Behrend
 Discovery Circumstances: Numbered Minor Planets (5001)-(10000) – Minor Planet Center
 
 

007816
Discoveries by Masahiro Koishikawa
Named minor planets
Hanoi
19871218